Malchow Abbey (Kloster Malchow) is a former Cistercian nunnery in Malchow in the district of Mecklenburgische Seenplatte in Mecklenburg-Vorpommern, Germany. The monastic buildings are on the east shore of the Malchower See (Lake Malchow) and now accommodate the Mecklenburgisches Orgelmuseum.

History
In 1298 the Cistercian nunnery formerly situated at Röbel settled in Alt-Malchow and took over the premises of the former Magdalene community here. Nicholas II, Prince of Werle, gave the new nunnery the patronage of the churches at Alt-Malchow, Neu-Malchow and Lexow (in Walow). After the Reformation the abbey was a collegiate foundation for noblewomen (Damenstift) from 1572 to 1923.

Buildings
The former abbey building complex is now dominated by the church, which was built between 1844 and 1849 to plans by Friedrich Wilhelm Buttel. These included a 52-metre high brick tower, after the addition of which it was thought necessary to refurbish the nave for aesthetic reasons. Before 1844 the church was a simple stone building.

After a fire in 1888 the church was rebuilt in a Gothic Revival between 1888 and 1890 according to plans by Georg Daniel.

Of the old abbey buildings there still exist the cloister, as well as some ancillary buildings now used for residential purposes.

Mecklenburgisches Orgelmuseum
In the abbey church and the nearby organ courtyard is a permanent exhibition relating to the history of organ-building in Mecklenburg. The Mecklenburg Organ Museum (Mecklenburgisches Orgelmuseum) is the first of its sort in the new Bundesländer. In the abbey church itself there is an organ by Friedrich Friese III.

Garden
The abbey complex also includes the Engelsche Garten, laid out by, and named after, Johann Jacob Christian Engel (1762–1840), master of the abbey kitchen from 1786 to 1818. It was not completed until 1855/56.

See also 
 List of music museums

Sources
 Mecklenburgisches Orgelmuseum in Kloster Malchow

External links

Monasteries in Mecklenburg-Western Pomerania
Religious organizations established in the 1290s
1290s establishments in the Holy Roman Empire
1298 establishments in Europe
Christian monasteries established in the 13th century
Cistercian nunneries in Germany
Lutheran women's convents
Convents in Germany
Religious organizations disestablished in 1923
Museums in Mecklenburg-Western Pomerania
Music museums in Germany
Musical instrument museums
History of Mecklenburg-Western Pomerania